Dendrobium uniflorum  is a member of the family Orchidaceae. It is native to the Malesia and Southeast Asia regions, in Thailand, Vietnam, Malaysia, Philippines, Borneo, Sulawesi, Sumatra.

Description
Dendrobium uniflorum is a small to medium size, warm growing epiphyte. It has thin, semi-pendulous to erect, clumping pseudobulbs that carry many, unsubdivided, pointed fleshy leaves.

References

External links 

uniflorum
Epiphytic orchids
Flora of Malesia
Orchids of Thailand
Orchids of Vietnam
Plants described in 1851